Umqhele is the second studio album by South African singer and songwriter Sjava. It was released on December 14, 2018, by Ambitiouz Entertainment. The album was produced by Mace and Ruff.

Umqhele debuted at number one in South Africa. The album was named the most streamed South African album of all time by Apple Music.

Background 
In early December 2018, he teased the album and captioned, "#UMQHELE 14 DECEMBER 2018", via his Twitter account.

Accolades 
At the 25th South African Music Awards Umqhele won Best Afro Pop Album, Album of the Year, and nominated for Best Engineered Album.

!
|-
|rowspan="3"|2019
|rowspan="3"|<div style="text-align: center;">Umqhele
| Best Afro Pop Album 
|
|rowspan="3"|
|-
|Album of the Year
|
|-
| Best Engineered Album 
|

Track listing

Personnel 
Credits for Umqhele adapted from AllMusic.
 Mnqobi Nxumalo - Composer
 Buhlebendalo Mda - Composer 
 Thabang Gomba - Composer 
 Vuyo Mnyike - Composer 
 Tumisang Molefi - Composer 
 Ruff Nkosi - Composer 
 Sjava - Primary Artist 
 Bheki Christopher Thobela - Composer

Featured artists 
 Buhlebendalo - 
 Anzo - 
 Mzukulu - 
 Bongani Radebe - 
 Fasto - 
 Howard - 
 Nue Sam -

Release history

References 

2018 albums
Sjava albums
Ambitiouz Entertainment albums